Lensworld–Kuota (UCI code LWK) is a former professional cycling team based in Belgium, which competed in elite road bicycle racing events such as the UCI Women's Road World Cup.

In October 2017, the team announced they would fold before the start of the 2018 season. Lensworld had been recently taken over by peer – LensOnline – who decided not to renew the title sponsorship of the team.

Team history

2014
For the 2015 season the team announced on their Facebook account that current minor sponsor, Lensworld.eu,  would step up and become a named sponsor of the team, giving a new team name of Lensworld–Zannata.

Riders in
For the 2015 season the team announced that Mariël Borgerink, Kim de Baat and Kaat Van der Meulen. Mieke Kröger, Evy Kuijpers, Annelies Dom, Annelies Van Doorslaer and Sofie De Vuyst also signed contract extensions. On November 9 the team signed Céline Van Severen and Marissa Otten Parkhotel Valkenberg.

Team roster

Major wins
2013
UCI Track World Cup, Aguascalientes (Team Pursuit ), Stephanie Pohl & Mieke Kröger
UCI Track World Cup, Aguascalientes (Points race), Stephanie Pohl
2014
 Provincial Time Trial Championships (Oost-Vlaanderen), Latoya Brulee
 Provincial Road Race Championships (Vlaams-Brabant), Annelies Van Doorslaer
Herford Frühjahrsrennen, Janine Van der Meer
2015
Provincial Time Trial Championships (Vlaams-Brabant), Annelies Van Doorslaer
2016
Stage (ITT) Vuelta Internacional Femenina a Costa Rica, Flávia Oliveira
 National Road Race championships, Kaat Hannes
Stage 2 BeNe Ladies Tour, Nina Kessler
Stage 2 (ITT) Tour de Pologne Féminin, Flávia Oliveira
Stage 4 Tour Cycliste Féminin International de l'Ardèche, Flávia Oliveira
2017
 Sprints classification Holland Ladies Tour, Winanda Spoor

National and continental champions
2013
 Netherlands University Road Race, Anouska Koster
 German Track (Omnium), Mieke Kröger
2014
 European U23 Time Trial, Mieke Kröger
2015
 Netherlands Track (Madison), Nina Kessler
2016
 Italy U23 Cyclocross, Alice Maria Arzuffi
 Italy Track (Points race), Maria Giulia Confalonieri
 Belgium Road Race, Kaat Hannes
 Netherlands Track (Omnium), Nina Kessler
 Netherlands Track (Madison), Nina Kessler
2017
 European Track Championships (Team pursuit), Tatiana Guderzo

References

External links

Cycling teams based in Belgium
Cycling teams based in the Netherlands
UCI Women's Teams
Cycling teams established in 2013